Piccalilli, or mustard pickle, is a British interpretation of South Asian pickles, a relish of chopped and pickled vegetables and spices. Regional recipes vary considerably.

Etymology
The Oxford English Dictionary traces the word to the middle of the 18th century when, in 1758, Hannah Glasse described how "to make Paco-Lilla, or India Pickle". An apparently earlier reference is in Anne Blencowe's Receipt Book, written , which has "To Pickle Lila, an Indian Pickle" credited to Lord Kilmory.

The more familiar form of the word appears in 1769, in Elizabeth Raffald's The Experienced English Housekeeper, as "To make Indian pickle, or Piccalillo". Richard Briggs, in his 1788 The English Art of Cookery, similarly calls it "Picca Lillo". The spelling "piccalilli" can be seen in an advertisement in a 1799 edition of The Times.

British piccalilli

British piccalilli contains vegetables—regularly cauliflower, onion, courgette and gherkin—and seasonings of mustard and turmeric. A more finely chopped variety, "sandwich piccalilli" is also available from major British supermarkets. It is used as an accompaniment to foods such as sausages, bacon, eggs, toast, cheese, and tomatoes. It is eaten as a relish with cold meats such as ham and brawn, and with a ploughman's lunch. 
It is usually expected to be offered over Christmas, as it brightens up cold turkey and other leftovers. It is usually made in the autumn, when pickling onions become available, and with a steeping process of around two months it will be ready just in time for the festive table.  As well as being a commercial product, piccalilli is a mainstay of Women's Institute and farmhouse product stalls.

Cypriot piccalilli

An unsweetened variation of British piccalilli is found in Cyprus (including northern Cyprus). It is without baby onions, with a milder mustard sauce, and with the addition of carrot pieces. Piccalilli is known in Cyprus as πίκλα (pikla) in Cypriot Greek, and bikla in Cypriot Turkish. It is served as a condiment, and occasionally as a meze dish.

American piccalilli

In the Northeastern United States, commercial piccalillis are made with a base of sweet peppers or green tomatoes. This style is somewhat similar to sweet pepper relish, with the piccalilli being distinguished by having a darker red or green color and, like British piccalilli, the chunks are larger and it is slightly sweeter. It is commonly used as a topping on such foods as hamburgers and hot dogs. British-style, yellow, piccalilli is also available.

In the Midwestern United States, commercial piccalillis are based on finely chopped gherkins. Bright green and on the sweet side, they are often used as a condiment for Chicago-style hot dogs. This style is sometimes called "neon relish".

In the Southern United States, piccalilli is not commonly served. In its place, chow-chow, a relish with a base of chopped green (unripe) tomatoes, is offered. This relish may also include onions, bell peppers, cabbage, green beans, and other vegetables. While not similar to other piccalillis, chow-chow is often called as such and the terms may be used interchangeably.

In the Western United States, piccalilli is uncommon.

Surinamese piccalilli

A far spicier variant of piccalilli comes from the former Dutch colony of Suriname, where traditional British piccalilli is mixed with a sambal made of garlic and yellow Madame Jeanette peppers. This piccalilli is often homemade but can also be bought in jars in Dutch corner shops. Whilst Surinamese piccalilli is similar in appearance to ordinary piccalilli, the taste is much spicier.

Media references

As a term for a mixed collection, piccalilli lends its name to several books of poems, for example, Piccalilli: A Mixture, by Gilbert Percy (1862), and Dilly Dilly Piccalilli: Poems for the Very Young (1989), by Myra Cohn Livingston. Mr Piccalilli is the name of a character in the children's book Mr Pod and Mr Piccalilli (2005), by Penny Dolan.

The song "Lily the Pink", recorded in 1968 by UK comedy group The Scaffold, includes a humorous reference to piccalilli when describing Lily's eventual demise, in the lyric "...and despite her medicinal compound, sadly Picca-Lily died". The song was based on an earlier folk song "the Ballad of Lydia Pinkham", which celebrated a herbal remedy invented by the eponymous heroine, marketed from 1876 as "Lydia E. Pinkham's Vegetable Compound". The connection between piccalilli and the vegetable compound is in name only, as the recipes differ completely.

See also

References

External links

Piccalilli recipes from RecipeSource
British piccalilli recipe from the BBC
U.S. Southern-style chow-chow 

Pickles
British condiments
American condiments
Cypriot cuisine
Surinamese cuisine
Brassica oleracea dishes
Vegetable dishes